Saans (English: Breath) is an Indian television series written and directed by actress Neena Gupta who works in the series as well alongside television actor Kanwaljit Singh. The series premiered on Star Plus in 1998. The story focused on the accidental love triangle between the characters Priya, Gautam, and Manisha. Neena Gupta won the award for 'Best Director' and Kanwaljit Singh won for the 'Best Actor' categories at the Kalakar Awards 1998.

Plot
The story revolved around Priya and Gautam, who were a happily married couple with two children, Akul and Mithi.  Everything went wrong when Priya and Gautam became friends with Manisha. Manisha falls in love with Gautam, then Manisha and Gautam have an affair. When Priya finds out, it is up to Priya to get her husband back in line.

Cast and characters
 Neena Gupta as Priya Gautam Kapoor
 Kanwaljit Singh as Gautam Kapoor
 Kavita Kapoor as Manisha
 Shagufta Ali as Shakutala Suri
 Ashok Lokhande as Mr. Suri
 Sushmita Daan as Mithi Kapoor
 Bharti Jaffrey as Priya's Mother 
 Bharat Kapoor as Ajit
 Neelima Azeem as Ajit's Estranged Wife
 Rakesh Pandey as Gautam's Father 
 Asha Sharma as  Mr. Suri's Mother 
 Neelam Singh  as Neelam Dhawan
 Akul Tripathi as Akul Kapoor 
 Jatin Sial as Jatin Kapoor

Production
Initially, Director Neena Gupta offered Saans for Zee TV. However, when they rejected the series, Star Plus accepted it.

Reception
The show initially received  mixed reviews from critics. The Tribune quoted the series as 'A breath of fresh air'.

References

External links
Saans Official Site on STAR Syndication

StarPlus original programming
Indian drama television series
Indian television soap operas
1998 Indian television series debuts
1999 Indian television series endings
Gulzar